The Ghana Institute of Journalism is a public university in Ghana. The institute has accreditation from the National Accreditation Board.

History
The Ghana Institute of Journalism was established on 16 October 1959 by Kwame Nkrumah, the first president of Ghana. 
Kwame Nkrumah had a vision to train a patriotic cadre corps of journalists to play an effective role in the emancipation of the African continent hence established the Ghana Institute of Journalism.

The school was formally called School of Journalism which was a department at the Accra Technical Institute now Accra Technical University. The school had Mr Richard McMillan who was then due for retirement as the Director of the British Information Services in Ghana as its first principal and journalism tutor.

In 1974, the National Redemption Council (NRC) passed a legislative instrument (NRCD 275) formally establishing the Ghana Institute of Journalism. The decree set as objects of the Institute the following:

 To train young men and women in the skills and techniques of journalism, mass communication, advertising and public relations.

 To organize classes, lectures, seminars, demonstrations, experiments, researches and practical training in all aspects of journalism and mass communication.

University charter
The school got its presidential charter establishing it as a university in 2009.

Directors/rectors 
Richard McMillan served as the first principal of the Ghana Institute of Journalism. In 1959 when GIJ was established, he was then retiring as Director of British Information Services in Ghana. McMillan, who also taught journalism, served for three years as principal—until 1962. Today the GIJ library is named the Richard McMillan Library in honour of the institute's first principal.

Programs 
The school runs Diploma, Bachelor of Arts and Masters programs.

 The Diploma Program is a 2-year program consists of communication, social sciences and arts subjects.
 The Bachelor of Arts program is a 4-year program with options of specializing in either Journalism or Public Relations.
 The Masters Programs is a 1-year program with options to specialize in Public Relations, Journalism, Media Management and Development Communication.

Controversies 
The management of the university was labeled as 'insensitive' to the hardship caused by the COVID-19 pandemic after the school increased its facility user fees for 2020/21 academic year. It led to a protest on social media and the decision was later reversed.

The management of the institution asked students who paid their fees late to defer their courses for the academic year. The students protested and accused the management as 'unfair' and 'insensitive' as they were not aware of the consequences. Some students were denied access to the two campuses of the institution. The management later allowed the students to register for their end-of-semester exams.

Amnesty for non graduating students 
In November 2020, students who had not been able to graduate since 2013, were given the opportunity by the academic board to register and complete their programs. This was to be done within three years.

References

Universities in Ghana
Educational institutions established in 1959
1959 establishments in Ghana
Schools in Ghana